The Front Range Urban Corridor is an oblong region of urban population located along the eastern face of the Southern Rocky Mountains, encompassing 18 counties in the US states of Colorado and Wyoming.  The corridor derives its name from the Front Range, the mountain range that defines the western boundary of the corridor which serves as a gateway to the Rocky Mountains.  The region comprises the northern portion of the Southern Rocky Mountain Front geographic area, which in turn comprises the southern portion of the Rocky Mountain Front geographic area of Canada and the United States.  The Front Range Urban Corridor had a population of 5,055,344 at the 2020 Census, an increase of +16.65% since the 2010 Census. 

Its main transportation corridor is Interstate 25. There have been many proposals for Front Range Passenger Rail. None have come to fruition as of yet, though plans are under development.

Extent

The Front Range Urban Corridor stretches approximately 200 miles from Pueblo, Colorado, north along Interstate 25 to Cheyenne, Wyoming, and includes the Denver-Aurora-Lakewood, CO Metropolitan Statistical Area, the Colorado Springs, CO Metropolitan Statistical Area, the Boulder, CO Metropolitan Statistical Area, the Fort Collins, CO Metropolitan Statistical Area, the Greeley, CO Metropolitan Statistical Area, the Pueblo, CO Metropolitan Statistical Area, the Cheyenne, WY Metropolitan Statistical Area, and the Cañon City, CO Micropolitan Statistical Area.  The corridor comprises three primary subregions: the South Central Colorado Urban Area, the North Central Colorado Urban Area, and the Cheyenne Metropolitan Area.

The influence of the Corridor extends well beyond its defined boundaries.  The Colorado Eastern Plains, Nebraska Panhandle, and Albany County, Wyoming, among other areas, are culturally and economically tied to the Corridor, though they are not considered to be a part of it.

The definition included here is not used for the greater Southern Rocky Mountain Front, one of the 11 megaregions of the United States. The megaregion's area is more expansive, extending south from Pueblo along the I-25 corridor into New Mexico, including Albuquerque and Santa Fe, and also including the Wasatch Front of Utah, separated by hundreds of miles from the regional core.

Counties

Municipalities

Wyoming jurisdictions
In the State of Wyoming, the Front Range Urban Corridor includes the Town of Albin, the Town of Burns, the City of Cheyenne, the Town of Pine Bluffs, and unincorporated Laramie County.

Colorado jurisdictions
In the State of Colorado, the Front Range Urban Corridor includes:

Gallery of the most populous Front Range municipalities

See also

Southern Rocky Mountain Front
Front Range Urban Corridor
Southeast Wyoming
North Central Colorado Urban Area
South Central Colorado Urban Area
Colorado
Colorado statistical areas
Wyoming
Wyoming statistical areas

References

External links

United States Census Bureau
US population estimates

Megapolitan areas of the United States
Metropolitan areas of Colorado
Metropolitan areas of Wyoming
Regions of the United States